Alfredo Eduardo Quintana Bravo (20 March 1988 – 26 February 2021) was a Cuban-born Portuguese handballer who played as a goalkeeper for FC Porto and the Portugal national team.

He represented Portugal at the 2020 European Men's Handball Championship and 2021 World Men's Handball Championship.
Before acquiring the Portuguese nationality in 2014, he represented Cuba at the 2009 World Men's Handball Championship.

Death
On 22 February 2021, he suffered a cardiac arrest during a training session and fell into a coma. He was taken to São João Hospital where he fought for his life. Four days later, he died in hospital due to complications from the cardiac arrest.

Honours
Porto
Portuguese League: 2010–11, 2011–12, 2012–13, 2013–14, 2014–15, 2018–19, 2020–21
Portuguese Cup: 2018–19, 2020–21
Portuguese Supercup: 2014, 2019

References

External links

1988 births
2021 deaths
Sportspeople from Havana
Portuguese people of Cuban descent
Portuguese male handball players
FC Porto handball players
Handball players at the 2007 Pan American Games
Pan American Games bronze medalists for Cuba
Pan American Games medalists in handball
Universiade gold medalists for Portugal
Universiade medalists in handball
Medalists at the 2015 Summer Universiade
Medalists at the 2007 Pan American Games